Stargunner is a horizontally scrolling shooter for the Atari 2600 written by Alex Leavens and published by Telesys in 1982. Leavens also worked on ports of Gorf and Crazy Climber for the 2600, released by CBS and Atari, Inc., respectively.

Reception
Video Games Player magazine, in the August/September 1983 issue, called Stargunner "a better than average outer space shoot-'em-up game."

References

External links 
 

Atari 2600 games
Atari 2600-only games
1982 video games
Horizontally scrolling shooters
Video games developed in the United States